The Santa Catalina Arch  is one of the distinguishable landmarks in Antigua Guatemala, Guatemala, located on 5th Avenue North. Built in the 17th century, it originally connected the Santa Catalina convent to a school, allowing the cloistered nuns to pass from one building to the other without going out on the street. A clock on top was added in the era of the Central American Federation, in the 1830s. The Guatemala Post Office Building in Guatemala City is based upon the arch.

References

Arches and vaults
Buildings and structures in Antigua Guatemala